General Dempsey  may refer to:

Martin Dempsey, U.S. Army General and 18th Chairman of the U.S. Joint Chiefs of Staff 
Sir Miles Dempsey (1896–1969), British Army general, and commander of the British Second Army during the Invasion of Normandy during World War II

See also
Dempsey